The Military ranks of North Macedonia are the ranks used by the Army of the Republic of North Macedonia. The ranks are divided into four main groups, depending on the position and function: Generals, officers, non-commissioned officers and soldiers. Being a landlocked country, North Macedonia does not have a navy.

The current system of ranks and insignia was introduced in 1991 thus replacing the former Yugoslav Army insignia, on which it is based.

Military ranks
Officers
The rank insignia for commissioned officers.

Enlisted
The rank insignia for enlisted and NCO personnel.

Historic ranks

References

 
 

 
North Macedonia